"Come Home Soon" is a song recorded by American country music group SHeDAISY. It was released in July 2004 as the second single from their album Sweet Right Here. The song was written by SHeDAISY member Kristyn Osborn with John Shanks.

Content
The song is a ballad about a woman who expresses the loneliness of her husband, who is a deployed service member, and pleads him to "come home soon". According to Osborn, "it could be relatable to anyone who is separated from a loved one. But it was inspired by the circumstances of a soldier being taken away from his family and sent to do something he didn't understand or really want to do."

The group sold "Come Home Soon" bracelets with all proceeds going to the American Red Cross.

Music video
The music video was directed by Steven Goldmann and premiered in mid-2004. It depicts the three sisters, plus many others, walking down a street at night holding candles at a vigil, ending with a message that reads "For all our heroes, here at home".

Chart performance
"Come Home Soon" debuted at number 51 on the U.S. Billboard Hot Country Songs chart for the week of July 10, 2004.

References

2004 singles
SHeDAISY songs
Songs written by John Shanks
Song recordings produced by Dann Huff
Lyric Street Records singles
Music videos directed by Steven Goldmann
Songs written by Kristyn Osborn
2004 songs